The following is a family tree of the Mexica Emperors from 1376 to 1525.

See also

List of Tenochtitlan rulers

 
Aztec
 
Mexican noble families